Thomas Chappell may refer to:
Tom Chappell, CEO of Tom's of Maine
Thomas Patey Chappell, 19th century British music publisher of the firm Chappell & Co.